The Gabral Valley is a valley in the Swat District of Khyber Pakhtunkhwa province, Pakistan.  It is located in the south slopes of the westernmost end of the Himalayas.  Its lower end is at the town of Gabral, about 20 km north (by road) from Kalam and 120 km north of Islamabad, at an altitude of 2290 m.  The name is also spelled as Gabrāl.

The main part of the valley extends for about 38 km northwards of the town of Gabral. The Gabral River, a tributary of the Utrar River, runs through most of the valley. Hundreds of houses are scattered through the southernmost 7 km of the valley, but some farms are seen for the next 7–8 km. A road runs parallel to the river for about 14 km, until 2 km below Lake Kharkhari.

Kharkhari (also spelled Karkaray) is a small lake in Gabral Valley, about 400 m long and 250 m wide. It is traversed by the Gabral River. It is located about 41 km by road from the town of Kalam, 16 km north of the town of Gabral and 9 km north of the Gul Bandaj bridge, at an altitude of 5160 meters (See note in "talk page" about this elevation?).

Flora and fauna
The natural resources of the region include several medicinal herbs that are collected for local use and export.

References

Tourist attractions in Swat
Geography of Khyber Pakhtunkhwa